Liff railway station served the village of Liff, Angus, Scotland from 1861 to 1955 on the Dundee and Newtyle Railway; its location is within the Dundee City area.

History 
The station opened on 10 June 1861 by the Dundee and Newtyle Railway. There was a siding to the west which served the goods yard. Dundee Linoleum Works opened in 1920 and was situated to the east. The station closed to both passengers and goods traffic on 10 January 1955. The station site is now a sports centre.

References

External links 

Disused railway stations in Dundee
Former Caledonian Railway stations
Railway stations in Great Britain opened in 1861
Railway stations in Great Britain closed in 1955
1861 establishments in Scotland
1955 disestablishments in Scotland